Đakovići may refer to:

 Đakovići (Čajniče), a village in Bosnia and Herzegovina
 Đakovići (Goražde), a village in Bosnia and Herzegovina